Digital Audio Broadcasting (DAB) is a digital radio standard for broadcasting digital audio radio services in many countries around the world, defined, supported, marketed and promoted by the WorldDAB organisation. The standard is dominant in Europe and is also used in Australia, and in parts of Africa and Asia.

As of 2022, 55 countries are running DAB services. The majority of these services are using the upgraded DAB+ standard, with only the UK, New Zealand, Romania, Brunei Darussalam, and the Philippines still using a significant number of original DAB services. Initially it was expected in many countries that existing FM services would switch over to DAB, although the take up of DAB has been much slower than expected;. , Norway is the first country to have implemented a national FM radio switch-off, with others to follow in the next years.

The DAB standard was initiated as a European research project called Eureka-147 in the 1980s. The Norwegian Broadcasting Corporation (NRK) launched the first DAB channel in the world on 1 June 1995 (NRK Klassisk), and the BBC and Swedish Radio (SR) launched their first broadcasts later that year. Consumer-grade DAB receivers have been available in many countries since the start of this millennium. The original version of DAB used the MP2 audio codec; an upgraded version of the system was later developed and released named DAB+ which uses the HE-AAC v2 (AAC+) audio codec and is more robust and efficient. DAB is not forward compatible with DAB+.

DAB is generally more efficient in its use of spectrum than analogue FM radio, and thus can offer more radio services for the same given bandwidth. The broadcaster can select any desired sound quality, from high-fidelity signals for music to low-fidelity signals for talk radio, in which case the sound quality can be noticeably inferior to analog FM. High-fidelity equates to a high bit rate and higher transmission cost. DAB is more robust with regard to noise and multipath fading for mobile listening, although DAB reception quality degrades rapidly when the signal strength falls below a critical threshold (as is normal for digital broadcasts), whereas FM reception quality degrades slowly with the decreasing signal, providing effective coverage over a larger area.

DAB+ is a "green" platform and brings 85 percent energy consumption savings compared to FM broadcasting.

Similar terrestrial digital radio standards are HD Radio, ISDB-Tb, DRM, and the related DMB.

History and development

DAB has been under development since 1981 at the Institut für Rundfunktechnik (IRT). The first DAB demonstrations were held in 1985 at the WARC-ORB in Geneva, and in 1988 the first DAB transmissions were made in Germany. Later, DAB was developed as a research project for the European Union (EUREKA), which started in 1987 on an initiative by a consortium formed in 1986. The MPEG-1 Audio Layer II ("MP2") codec was created as part of the EU147 project. DAB was the first standard based on orthogonal frequency-division multiplexing (OFDM) modulation technique, which since then has become one of the most popular transmission schemes for modern wideband digital communication systems.

A choice of audio codec, modulation and error-correction coding schemes and first trial broadcasts were made in 1990. Public demonstrations were made in 1993 in the United Kingdom. The protocol specification was finalized in 1993 and adopted by the ITU-R standardization body in 1994, the European community in 1995 and by ETSI in 1997. Pilot broadcasts were launched in several countries in 1995.

In October 2005, the World DMB Forum instructed its Technical Committee to carry out the work needed to adopt the AAC+ audio codec and stronger error correction coding. The AAC+ audio coding standard uses a modified discrete cosine transform (MDCT) audio data compression algorithm. This work led to the launch of the DAB+ system.

By 2006, 500 million people worldwide were in the coverage area of DAB broadcasts, although by this time sales of receivers had only taken off in the United Kingdom (UK) and Denmark. In 2006 there were approximately 1,000 DAB stations in operation worldwide. As of 2018, over 68 million devices have been sold worldwide, and over 2,270 DAB services are on air.

In October 2018, the WorldDAB organisation introduced an all-new logo for DAB (specifically DAB+) to replace the previous logo that had been in use since before DAB's initial launch in 1995.

DAB+

The term "DAB" most commonly refers both to a specific DAB standard using the MP2 audio codec, but can sometimes refer to a whole family of DAB-related standards, such as DAB+, DMB, and DAB-IP.

WorldDAB, the organisation in charge of the DAB standards, announced DAB+, a major upgrade to the DAB standard in 2006, when the HE-AAC v2 audio codec (also known as eAAC+) was adopted. AAC+ uses a modified discrete cosine transform (MDCT) algorithm. The new standard, which is called DAB+, has also adopted the MPEG Surround audio format and stronger error correction coding in the form of Reed–Solomon coding. DAB+ has been standardised as European Telecommunications Standards Institute (ETSI) TS 102 563.

As DAB is not forward compatible with DAB+, older DAB receivers cannot receive DAB+ broadcasts. However, DAB receivers that were capable of receiving the new DAB+ standard after a firmware upgrade were being sold as early as July 2007. Generally, if a receiver is DAB+ compatible, there will be a sign on the product packaging.

DAB+ broadcasts have launched in several countries like Australia, Czech Republic, Denmark, Germany, Hong Kong (now terminated), Italy, Malta, Norway, Poland, Switzerland, Belgium (October 2017), the United Kingdom and the Netherlands. Malta was the first country to launch DAB+ in Europe in October 2008. South Africa began a DAB+ technical pilot in November 2014 on channel 13F in Band 3. If DAB+ stations launch in established DAB countries, they can transmit alongside existing DAB stations that use the older MPEG-1 Audio Layer II audio format, and most existing DAB stations are expected to continue broadcasting until the vast majority of receivers support DAB+.

In the UK, DAB+ launched in January 2016 following a trial period starting September 2014. Ofcom published a consultation for a new national multiplex containing a mix of DAB and DAB+ services, with the intention of moving all services to DAB+ in the long term. In February 2016, the new national network Sound Digital launched with three DAB+ stations. In August 2021 the BBC started its first regular domestic broadcast of DAB+ in the Channel Islands and followed later with the start of local broadcasts in December 2021 in Cumbria and north Lancashire.

DMB

Digital multimedia broadcasting (DMB) and DAB-IP are both suitable for mobile radio and TV because they support MPEG 4 AVC and WMV9 respectively as video codecs. However, a DMB video subchannel can easily be added to any DAB transmission, as it was designed to be carried on a DAB subchannel. DMB broadcasts in South Korea carry conventional MPEG 1 Layer II DAB audio services alongside their DMB video services.

, DMB is currently broadcast in Norway, South Korea, and Thailand.

DAB-IP
Trials for DAB-IP were held in London in 2006, as "BT Movio". It competed with DVB-H and MediaFLO which were also under testing.

Countries using DAB

55 countries provide regular or trial DAB(+) broadcasts. In spectrum management, the bands that are allocated for public DAB services, are abbreviated with T-DAB.

In the European Union, "the European Electronic Communications Code (EECC) entered into force on 20 December 2018, with transposition into national legislation by Member States required by 21 December 2020. The Directive applies to all EU member states regardless of the status of DAB+ in each country. 
This means that since the end of 2020, across all EU countries, all radios in new cars must be capable of receiving and reproducing digital terrestrial radio."

Following the European Union's obligation in 2020 to include DAB+ receivers in new cars, Belgium has stopped all sales of analogue radio receivers from 1 January 2023. Thus, consumers are no longer able to purchase FM or AM receivers for domestic use. “The obligation to incorporate DAB+ for new cars and domestic radio receivers is a nice step ahead in the digitisation of our radio landscape,” commented Benjamin Dalle, the Flemish media minister.

FM to DAB(+) radio transition

Norway
Norway was the first country to announce a complete switch-off of national FM radio stations. The switch-off started on 11 January 2017 and ended on 13 December 2017. The 2017 switch-off did not affect some local and regional radio stations. They can continue to transmit on FM until 2027.

The timetable for the closure of FM signals in 2017 were as follows:
 11 January in Nordland (all radio)
 8 February in Trøndelag and Møre og Romsdal (NRK Radio)
 21 April in Trøndelag and Møre og Romsdal (P4, Radio Norge and local radio)
 26 April in Telemark, Buskerud, Hedmark and Oppland (NRK)
 16 June in Telemark, Buskerud, Hedmark and Oppland (P4, Radio Norge and local radio)
 21 June in Sogn og Fjordane, Hordaland, Rogaland and Agder (NRK)
 15 September in Sogn og Fjordane, Hordaland, Rogaland and Agder (P4, Radio Norge and local radio)
 20 September in Østfold, Vestfold, Oslo and Akershus (NRK)
 8 December in Østfold, Vestfold, Oslo and Akershus (P4, Radio Norge and local radio)
 13 December in Troms and Finnmark (all radio)

Switzerland
Swiss radio broadcasters will shut down FM radio on 31 December 2024.

Other countries
Malta was the first European country to roll out a DAB+ network and services have been on-air since 2008. It covers 100% of the population.
In Italy, Rai Radio is proposing the country to begin switching off FM transmitters starting in 2025 with the goal of being all digital and shuttering FM broadcasting entirely in 2030. In the northern region of Italy's South Tyrol - Alto Adige, the broadcaster RAS has started switching FM services off.
"The government of Denmark has proposed a closure of FM broadcasting two years after more than half of radio listening is digital."
In Sweden, "the regulator MPRT has been commissioned by the Swedish government to review the conditions for commercial radio in the longer term (Ku 2021/01993). In dialogue with relevant actors, including the industry, the authority plans to analyse the need for any changes in the regulations for licensing with the aim of submitting a final report to the Ministry of Culture by December 2022."
In the United Kingdom, the government agreed with the Digital Radio and Audio Review's main conclusion that there should be no formal switch-off of analogue radio services before 2030 at the earliest, and notes that the ongoing decline of analogue listening makes it appropriate to consider updating elements of the legislative framework to support a smooth transition of services away from analogue in due course. Government also agreed that government and industry should look at this again in 2026.
In Poland, following consultations the KRRiT has adopted a position on the end of analogue radio broadcasting "no earlier than 31 December 2026 and no later than 31 December 2030".
In the Netherlands, the expectations are about official switch off of FM radio between 2027 and 2032.
Belgium has also expressed readiness to switch to DAB broadcasting: "Flemish Minister of Media Benjamin Dalle expects that the final shutdown of the FM frequencies, the so-called 'switch off', will take place between 2028 and 2031. According to him, the VRT must be a forerunner in the digitisation of the radio landscape. For example, if the 'switch off' does not come on January 1, 2028, it may be an option, according to Dalle, to fully digitise one of the VRT channels."
Moldova will abandon FM radio and switch to digital radio, according to an announcement made by the Ministry of Infrastructure and Regional Development.
Germany has not yet reached an agreement for full digital terrestrial radio transition, instead the country intensely invests in DAB+ transmission sites development and simultaneous DAB+/FM broadcasting.
In the Czech Republic, the situation is similar as in Germany - plans are for simultaneous DAB+/FM broadcasting.
In Estonia, radio stations with Levira's support started testing digital radio frequencies in November 2022. “One of our objectives for the coming year is to create the necessary technical conditions for the development of digital radio,” said Oliver Gailan, head of the communications department of the country's consumer protection and technical regulatory authority, the TTJA.
In Haute-Vienne, a department in the Nouvelle-Aquitaine region in southwest-central France, since 6 December 2022, the Groupement de radios associatives libres en Limousin (Gral), has swapped the traditional FM broadcasting for DAB+.

Technology

Bands and modes
DAB uses a wide-bandwidth broadcast technology and typically spectra have been allocated for it in Band III (174–240 MHz) and L band (1452–1492 MHz), although the scheme allows for operation between 30 and 300 MHz. The US military has reserved L-Band in the USA only, blocking its use for other purposes in America, and the United States has reached an agreement with Canada to restrict L-Band DAB to terrestrial broadcast to avoid interference.

DAB historically had a number of country-specific transmission modes (I, II, III, and IV).
 Mode I for Band III, Earth
 Mode II for L-Band, Earth and satellite
 Mode III for frequencies below 3 GHz, Earth and satellite
 Mode IV for L-Band, Earth and satellite
In January 2017, an updated DAB specification (2.1.1) removed Modes II, III and IV, leaving only Mode I.

Protocol stack
From an OSI model protocol stack viewpoint, the technologies used on DAB inhabit the following layers: the audio codec inhabits the presentation layer. Below that is the data link layer, in charge of statistical time-division multiplexing and frame synchronization. Finally, the physical layer contains the error-correction coding, OFDM modulation, and dealing with the over-the-air transmission and reception of data. Some aspects of these are described below.

Audio codec
DAB uses the MPEG-1 Audio Layer II audio codec, which is often referred to as MP2 because of the ubiquitous MP3 (MPEG-1 Audio Layer III).

The newer DAB+ standard adopted the HE-AAC version 2 audio codec, commonly known as 'AAC+' or 'aacPlus'. AAC+ uses a modified discrete cosine transform (MDCT) algorithm, and is approximately three times more efficient than MP2, which means that broadcasters using DAB+ are able to provide far higher audio quality or far more stations than they could with DAB, or a combination of both higher audio quality and more stations.

One of the most important decisions regarding the design of a digital radio broadcasting system is the choice of which audio codec to use because the efficiency of the audio codec determines how many radio stations can be carried on a fixed capacity multiplex at a given level of audio quality.

Error-correction coding
Error-correction coding (ECC) is an important technology for a digital communication system because it determines how robust the reception will be for a given signal strength – stronger ECC will provide a more robust reception than a weaker form.

The old version of DAB uses punctured convolutional coding for its ECC. The coding scheme uses unequal error protection (UEP), which means that parts of the audio bit-stream that are more susceptible to errors causing audible disturbances are provided with more protection (i.e. a lower code rate) and vice versa. However, the UEP scheme used on DAB results in a grey area in between the user experiencing good reception quality and no reception at all, as opposed to the situation with most other wireless digital communication systems that have a sharp "digital cliff", where the signal rapidly becomes unusable if the signal strength drops below a certain threshold. When DAB listeners receive a signal in this intermediate strength area they experience a "burbling" sound which interrupts the playback of the audio.

The DAB+ standard incorporates Reed–Solomon ECC as an "inner layer" of coding that is placed around the byte interleaved audio frame but inside the "outer layer" of convolutional coding used by the original DAB system, although on DAB+ the convolutional coding uses equal error protection (EEP) rather than UEP since each bit is equally important in DAB+. This combination of Reed–Solomon coding as the inner layer of coding, followed by an outer layer of convolutional coding – so-called "concatenated coding" – became a popular ECC scheme in the 1990s, and NASA adopted it for its deep-space missions. One slight difference between the concatenated coding used by the DAB+ system and that used on most other systems is that it uses a rectangular byte interleaver rather than Forney interleaving in order to provide a greater interleaver depth, which increases the distance over which error bursts will be spread out in the bit-stream, which in turn will allow the Reed–Solomon error decoder to correct a higher proportion of errors.

The ECC used on DAB+ is far stronger than is used on DAB, which, with all else being equal (i.e., if the transmission powers remained the same), would translate into people who currently experience reception difficulties on DAB receiving a much more robust signal with DAB+ transmissions. It also has a far steeper "digital cliff", and listening tests have shown that people prefer this when the signal strength is low compared to the shallower digital cliff on DAB.

Modulation
Immunity to fading and inter-symbol interference (caused by multipath propagation) is achieved without equalization by means of the OFDM and DQPSK modulation techniques. For details, see the OFDM system comparison table.

Using values for Transmission Mode I (TM I), the OFDM modulation consists of 1536 subcarriers that are transmitted in parallel. The useful part of the OFDM symbol period is 1.0 ms, which results in the OFDM subcarriers each having a bandwidth of 1 kHz due to the inverse relationship between these two parameters, and the overall OFDM channel bandwidth is 1537 kHz. The OFDM guard interval for TM I is 0.246 ms, which means that the overall OFDM symbol duration is 1.246 ms. The guard interval duration also determines the maximum separation between transmitters that are part of the same single-frequency network (SFN), which is approximately 74 km for TM I.

Single-frequency networks
OFDM allows the use of single-frequency networks (SFN), which means that a network of transmitters can provide coverage to a large area – up to the size of a country – where all transmitters use the same transmission frequency block. Transmitters that are part of an SFN need to be very accurately synchronised with other transmitters in the network, which requires the transmitters to use very accurate clocks.

When a receiver receives a signal that has been transmitted from the different transmitters that are part of an SFN, the signals from the different transmitters will typically have different delays, but to OFDM they will appear to simply be different multipaths of the same signal. Reception difficulties can arise, however, when the relative delay of multipaths exceeds the OFDM guard interval duration, and there are frequent reports of reception difficulties due to this issue when propagation conditions change, such as when there's high pressure, as signals travel farther than usual, and thus the signals are likely to arrive with a relative delay that is greater than the OFDM guard interval.

Low power gap-filler transmitters can be added to an SFN as and when desired in order to improve reception quality, although the way SFNs have been implemented in the UK up to now they have tended to consist of higher power transmitters being installed at main transmitter sites in order to keep costs down.

Bit rates
An ensemble has a maximum bit rate that can be carried, but this depends on which error protection level is used. However, all DAB multiplexes can carry a total of 864 "capacity units". The number of capacity units, or CU, that a certain bit-rate level requires depends on the amount of error correction added to the transmission, as described above.

Services and ensembles
Various different services are embedded into one ensemble (which is also typically called a multiplex). These services can include:
 Primary services, like main radio stations
 Secondary services, like additional sports commentaries
 Data services
 Electronic Programme Guide (EPG)
 Collections of HTML pages and digital images (known as 'broadcast websites')
 Slideshows, which may be synchronised with audio broadcasts. For example, a police appeal could be broadcast with the e-fit of a suspect or CCTV footage.
 Video
 Java platform applications
 IP tunnelling
 Other raw data

DAB and AM/FM compared
Traditionally, radio programmes were broadcast on different frequencies via AM and FM, and the radio had to be tuned into each frequency as needed. This used up a comparatively large amount of spectrum for a relatively small number of stations, limiting listening choice. DAB is a digital radio broadcasting system that, through the application of multiplexing and compression, combines multiple audio streams onto a relatively narrow band centred on a single broadcast frequency called a DAB ensemble.

Within an overall target bit rate for the DAB ensemble, individual stations can be allocated different bit rates. The number of channels within a DAB ensemble can be increased by lowering average bit rates, but at the expense of the quality of streams. Error correction under the DAB standard makes the signal more robust but reduces the total bit rate available for streams.

FM HD Radio versus DAB
DAB broadcasts a single multiplex that is approximately 1,500 kilohertz wide (≈1,000 kilobits per second). That multiplex is then subdivided into multiple digital streams of between 9 and 12 programs. In contrast, FM HD Radio adds its digital carriers to the traditional 270 kilohertz-wide analog channels, with capability of up to 300 kbit/s per station (pure digital mode).  The full bandwidth of the hybrid mode approaches 400 kHz.

The first generation DAB uses the MPEG-1 Audio Layer II (MP2) audio codec, which has less efficient compression than newer codecs. The typical bitrate for DAB stereo programs is only 128 kbit/s or less and, as a result, most radio stations on DAB have a lower sound quality than FM, prompting a number of complaints among the audiophile community. As with DAB+ or T-DMB in Europe, FM HD Radio uses a codec based upon the MPEG-4 HE-AAC standard.

HD Radio is a proprietary system from iBiquity Digital Corporation, a subsidiary of DTS, Inc. since 2015, which is itself owned by Xperi Corporation since 2016. DAB is an open standard deposited at ETSI.

Use of frequency spectrum and transmitter sites
DAB can give substantially higher spectral efficiency, measured in programmes per MHz and per transmitter site, than analogue systems. In many places, this has led to an increase in the number of stations available to listeners, especially outside of the major urban areas. This can be further improved with DAB+ which uses a much more efficient codec, allowing a lower bitrate per channel with little to no loss in quality. If some stations transmit in mono, their bitrate can be reduced compared to stereo broadcasts, further improving the efficiency.

Numerical example: Analog FM requires 0.2 MHz per programme. The frequency reuse factor in most countries is approximately 15 for stereo transmissions (with lesser factors for mono FM networks), meaning (in the case of stereo FM) that only one out of 15 transmitter sites can use the same channel frequency without problems with co-channel interference, i.e. cross-talk.  Assuming a total availability of 102 FM channels at a bandwidth of 0.2MHz over the Band II spectrum of 87.5 to 108.0 MHz, an average of 102/15 = 6.8 radio channels are possible on each transmitter site (plus lower-power local transmitters causing less interference). This results in a system spectral efficiency of 1 / 15 / (0.2 MHz) = 0.30 programmes/transmitter/MHz. DAB with 192 kbit/s codec requires 1.536 MHz * 192 kbit/s / 1,136 kbit/s = 0.26 MHz per audio programme. The frequency reuse factor for local programmes and multi-frequency broadcasting networks (MFN) is typically 4 or 5, resulting in 1 / 4 / (0.26 MHz) = 0.96 programmes/transmitter/MHz.  This is 3.2 times as efficient as analog FM for local stations. For single frequency network (SFN) transmission, for example of national programmes, the channel re-use factor is 1, resulting in 1/1/0.25 MHz = 3.85 programmes/transmitter/MHz, which is 12.7 times as efficient as FM for national and regional networks.

Note the above capacity improvement may not always be achieved at the L-band frequencies, since these are more sensitive to obstacles than the FM band frequencies, and may cause shadow fading for hilly terrain and for indoor communication. The number of transmitter sites or the transmission power required for full coverage of a country may be rather high at these frequencies, to avoid the system becoming noise limited rather than limited by co-channel interference.

Sound quality

The original objectives of converting to digital transmission were to enable higher fidelity, more stations and more resistance to noise, co-channel interference and multipath than in analogue FM radio. However, many countries in implementing DAB on stereo radio stations use compression to such a degree that it produces lower sound quality than that received from FM broadcasts. This is because of the bit rate levels being too low for the MPEG Layer 2 audio codec to provide high fidelity audio quality.

The BBC Research & Development department states that at least 192 kbit/s is necessary for a high fidelity stereo broadcast:

When the BBC in July 2006 reduced the bit-rate of transmission of its classical music station Radio 3 from 192 kbit/s to 160 kbit/s, the resulting degradation of audio quality prompted a number of complaints to the corporation. The BBC later announced that following this testing of new equipment, it would resume the previous practice of transmitting Radio 3 at 192 kbit/s whenever there were no other demands on bandwidth. (For comparison, BBC Radio 3 and all other BBC radio stations are now streamed using AAC at 320 kbit/s, described as 'HD', on BBC Radio iPlayer after a period when it was available at two different bit rates.)

Despite the above, a survey in 2007 of DAB listeners (including mobile) has shown most find DAB to have equal or better sound quality than FM.

By 2019 some stations had upgraded to DAB+ but rather than improving sound quality, they instead reduced it to 32 kbit/s or 64 kbit/s, often in mono.

Strengths and weaknesses

Benefits of DAB

Improved features for users
DAB devices perform band-scans over the entire frequency range, presenting all stations from a single list for the user to select from.

DAB is capable of providing metadata alongside the audio stream. Metadata allows visual information, text and graphics - such as the station name and logo, presenter, song title and album artwork - to be displayed while a station is playing. Radio stations can provide the metadata to augment the listening experience, particularly on car receivers which have large display panels.

DAB can carry "radiotext" (in DAB terminology, Dynamic Label Segment, or DLS) from the station giving real-time information such as song titles, music type and news or traffic updates, of up to 128 characters in length. This is similar to a feature of FM called RDS, which enables a radiotext of up to 64 characters.

The DAB transmission contains a local time of day and so a device may use this to automatically correct its internal clock when travelling between time zones and when changing to or from Daylight Saving.

More stations
DAB is not more bandwidth efficient than analogue measured in programmes per MHz of a specific transmitter (the so-called link spectral efficiency), but it is less susceptible to co-channel interference (cross talk), which makes it possible to reduce the reuse distance, i.e. use the same radio frequency channel more densely. The system spectral efficiency (the average number of radio programmes per MHz and transmitter) is a factor three more efficient than analogue FM for local radio stations. For national and regional radio networks, the efficiency is improved by more than an order of magnitude due to the use of SFNs. In that case, adjacent transmitters use the same frequency.

In certain areas – particularly rural areas – the introduction of DAB gives radio listeners a greater choice of radio stations. For instance, in Southern Norway, radio listeners experienced an increase in available stations from 6 to 21 when DAB was introduced in November 2006.

Reception quality
The DAB standard integrates features to reduce the negative consequences of multipath fading and signal noise, which afflict existing analogue systems.

Also, as DAB transmits digital audio, there is no hiss with a weak signal, which can happen on FM. However, radios in the fringe of a DAB signal can experience a "bubbling mud" sound interrupting the audio or the audio cutting out altogether.

Due to sensitivity to Doppler shift in combination with multipath propagation, DAB reception range (but not audio quality) is reduced when travelling speeds of more than 120 to 200 km/h, depending on carrier frequency.

Variable bandwidth
Mono talk radio, news and weather channels and other non-music programs need significantly less bandwidth than a typical music radio station, which allows DAB to carry these programmes at lower bit rates, leaving more bandwidth to be used for other programs.

However, this led to the situation where some stations are being broadcast in mono; see  for more details.

Transmission costs
DAB transmitters are inevitably more expensive than their FM counterparts. DAB uses higher frequencies than FM and therefore there may be a need to compensate with more transmitters to achieve the same coverage as a single FM transmitter. DAB is commonly transmitted by a different company from the broadcaster who then sells the capacity to a number of radio stations.  This shared cost can work out cheaper than operating an individual FM transmitter.

This efficiency originates from the ability a DAB network has in broadcasting more channels per transmitter/network. One network can broadcast 6–10 channels (with MP2 audio codec) or 10–18 channels (with HE AAC codec). Hence, it is thought that the replacement of FM-radios and FM-transmitters with new DAB-radios and DAB-transmitters will not cost any more compared with new FM facilities.  It is also argued that the power consumption will be lower for stations transmitted on a single DAB multiplex compared with individual analog transmitters.

Once applied, one operator has claimed that DAB transmission is as low as one-nineteenth of the cost of FM transmission.

Disadvantages of DAB

Reception quality
The reception quality during the early stage of deployment of DAB was poor even for people who live well within the coverage area. The reason for this is that DAB uses weak error correction coding, so that when there are a lot of errors with the received data not enough of the errors can be corrected and a "bubbling mud" sound occurs. In some cases a complete loss of signal can happen. This situation has been improved upon in the newer DAB+ version that uses stronger error correction coding and as additional transmitters are built.

As with other digital systems, when the signal is weak or suffers severe interference, it will not work at all.  DAB reception may also be a problem for receivers when the wanted signal is adjacent to a stronger one.  This was a particular issue for early and low cost receivers.

Audio quality
A common complaint by listeners is that broadcasters 'squeeze in' more stations per ensemble than recommended by:
Minimizing the bit-rate, to the lowest level of sound-quality that listeners are willing to tolerate, such as 112 kbit/s for stereo and even 48 kbit/s for mono speech radio (LBC 1152 and the Voice of Russia are examples).
Having few digital channels broadcasting in stereo.

Signal delay
The nature of a single-frequency network (SFN) is such that the transmitters in a network must broadcast the same signal at the same time. To achieve synchronization, the broadcaster must counter any differences in propagation time incurred by the different methods and distances involved in carrying the signal from the multiplexer to the different transmitters. This is done by applying a delay to the incoming signal at the transmitter based on a timestamp generated at the multiplexer, created taking into account the maximum likely propagation time, with a generous added margin for safety. Delays in the audio encoder and the receiver due to digital processing (e.g. deinterleaving) add to the overall delay perceived by the listener. The signal is delayed, usually by around 1 to 4 seconds and can be considerably longer for DAB+. This has disadvantages:
DAB radios are out of step with live events, so the experience of listening to live commentaries on events being watched is impaired;
Listeners using a combination of analogue (AM or FM) and DAB radios (e.g. in different rooms of a house) will hear a mixture when both receivers are within earshot.

Time signals, on the contrary, are not a problem in a well-defined network with a fixed delay. The DAB multiplexer adds the proper offset to the distributed time information. The time information is also independent from the (possibly varying) audio decoding delay in receivers since the time is not embedded inside the audio frames. This means that built in clocks in receivers can be precisely correct.

Transmission costs
DAB can provide savings for networks of several stations.  The original development of DAB was driven by national network operators with a number of channels to transmit from multiple sites.  However, for individual stations such as small community or local stations which traditionally operate their own FM transmitter on their own building the cost of DAB transmission will be much higher than analog.  Operating a DAB transmitter for a single station is not an efficient use of spectrum or power. With that said, this can be solved to some degree by combining multiple local stations in one DAB/DAB+ mux, similar to what is done on DVB-T/DVB-T2 with local TV stations.

Coverage

Compatibility
In 2006 tests began using the much improved HE-AAC codec for DAB+. Hardly any of the receivers made before 2008 support the newer codec, however, making them partially obsolete once DAB+ broadcasts begin and completely obsolete once all MP2 encoded stations are gone. Most new receivers are both DAB and DAB+ compatible; however, the issue is exacerbated by some manufacturers disabling the DAB+ features on otherwise compatible radios to save on licensing fees when sold in countries without current DAB+ broadcasts.

Power requirements

As DAB requires digital signal processing techniques to convert from the received digitally encoded signal to the analogue audio content, the complexity of the electronic circuitry required to do this is higher.  This translates into needing more power to effect this conversion than compared to an analogue FM to audio conversion, meaning that portable receiving equipment will have a much shorter battery life, and require higher power (and hence more bulk). This means that they use more energy than analogue Band II VHF receivers. However, thanks to increased integration (radio-on-chip), DAB receiver power usage has been reduced dramatically, making portable receivers far more usable.

Countries where FM to DAB(+) radio transition is cancelled/postponed
Whilst many countries have expected a shift to digital audio broadcasting, a few have moved in the opposite direction following unsuccessful trials.

Canada conducted trials of DAB in L-band in major cities.  However the success of satellite digital radio and lack of L-band DAB receivers led to the analogue switch-off being abandoned. Canada subsequently adopted HD Radio as used in the neighboring United States instead of DAB.
Finland abandoned DAB in 2005.
Hong Kong announced the termination of DAB in March 2017.
Portugal announced the termination of DAB in April 2011.
 In Korea, the transmission of MBC 11FM was stopped in 2015 and the DAB channel was switched to T-DMB V-Radio.
 DAB in Ireland was confined from 2017 to state broadcaster RTÉ Radio's multiplex, which was switched off in March 2021, after a survey showed 77% of adults listen to radio via FM, compared with 8% via digital means, of which 0.5% via DAB. RTÉ's service began in 2006, after trials in 1998 and 2001. A commercial multiplex was trialled in 2007–8 and licensed, including DAB+, from 2010 to 2017, but the licensee did not renew because of lack of takeup by broadcasters.
Hungary announced the termination of DAB+ on 5 September 2020, 12 years after its start.
Romania switched off DAB broadcast in September 2021 due to lack of interest both from broadcasters and listeners, low availability of receivers, low number of listeners and higher acceptance and interest in internet radio and FM. Romania started DAB broadcast in 2004, in the DAB format, did not adopt DAB+, and ever since the interest was low. It was only available in Bucharest, only public stations were available, although some private stations made some trials. DAB listeners were still in lower counts. Availability of DAB radios in stores was (and still is) low, and, despite the fact that some stores were offering DAB receivers, the interest remains limited (both because of lack of interest, higher price than an ordinary FM receiver and people are willing to pay the higher price for an internet device), most preferring internet radios or combined systems (devices with both FM and internet, although many such devices also have DAB capability, which is now rendered useless).
Sweden The Swedish government postponed the transition to DAB in 2016, following a report from the National Audit Office which criticized the benefits for the listeners compared to continued FM-transmissions paired other digital transmission techniques (4G, Internet) and the strength of FM-radio as a simple and reliable source for emergency/crisis information. Limited transmissions continue in Stockholm, Göteborg, Malmö and Luleå

See also
 Digital audio radio service
 Digital multimedia broadcasting (DMB)
 Digital Radio Mondiale (DRM)
 ETSI Satellite Digital Radio (SDR)
 FMeXtra
 HD Radio
 Internet radio device
 ISDB
 Satellite radio
 SHF
 Sirius XM satellite radio
 Spectral efficiency: comparison table
 Ultra high frequency (UHF)
 Very high frequency (VHF)

References

General
 ETSI specifications available at ETSI Publications Download Area, pda.etsi.org (this will open ETSI document search engine; to find the latest version of the document enter a search string; free registration is required to download PDF)
 Stott, J. H.; The How and Why of COFDM, BBC Research Development

External links
 WorldDAB, the global industry forum for digital radio
Digital Audio Broadcasting (DAB) - Canadian Communication Foundation
 ETSI EN 300 401 v1.4.1 – original DAB specification, etsi.org
 ETSI TS 102 563 V1.2.1 (2010-05) Technical Specification, etsi.org
 DAB Ensembles Worldwide (also known as "Wohnort", the main part of the site is a list of services currently transmitting)
 An overview of DAB+ services in Germany 

Digital radio
1995 introductions